Charles Hindley may refer to:

Charles Hindley (politician) (1796–1857), Member of Parliament for Ashton-under-Lyne, Lancashire, England
Charles Hindley (jockey), winner of the Epsom Derby and Epsom Oaks in the 18th century